Viktor Kudynskyi or Viktor Kudynskyy (17 June 1942 – 18 August 2005) was a Ukrainian athlete who competed in the 1968 Summer Olympics.

References

1942 births
2005 deaths
Soviet male long-distance runners
Soviet male steeplechase runners
Ukrainian male long-distance runners
Ukrainian male steeplechase runners
Olympic athletes of the Soviet Union
Athletes (track and field) at the 1968 Summer Olympics
European Athletics Championships medalists